Dipika Murthy (born 10 August 1980) is a member of the India women's national field hockey team. She played with the team when it won the Gold at the 2004 Hockey Asia Cup and won a silver in the 2009 Asia cup at bangkok. She has represented India at  the under-21 world cup in argentina 2001 and in two senior world cups in Spain 2006 and argentina in 2010. Her career includes Commonwealth Games Delhi 2010 and the Asian Games china 2010.

References 
Profile at Bharatiyahockey

1980 births
Living people
Field hockey players from Gujarat
Indian female field hockey players
Female field hockey goalkeepers
Asian Games medalists in field hockey
Field hockey players at the 2006 Asian Games
Field hockey players at the 2010 Asian Games
Sportswomen from Gujarat
Asian Games bronze medalists for India
21st-century Indian women
21st-century Indian people
Medalists at the 2006 Asian Games
Field hockey players at the 2010 Commonwealth Games
Commonwealth Games competitors for India